A list of films produced in France in 1916.

See also
 1916 in France

External links
 French films of 1916 at the Internet Movie Database

1916
Lists of 1916 films by country or language
Films